Uhřice may refer to places in the Czech Republic:

Uhřice (Blansko District), a municipality and village in the South Moravian Region
Uhřice (Hodonín District), a municipality and village in the South Moravian Region
Uhřice (Kroměříž District), a municipality and village in the Zlín Region
Uhřice (Vyškov District), a municipality and village in the South Moravian Region